Seget is a municipality in Croatia in the Split-Dalmatia County. It has a population of 4,854 (2011 census), 97.4% of whom are Croats.

References

External links

Populated places in Split-Dalmatia County
Municipalities of Croatia